Kahan (also Romanized as Kāhān; also known as Kāhān-e Bālā (Persian: كاهان بالا) and Kāhān-e ‘Olyā) is a village in Yam Rural District, Meshkan District, Khoshab County, Razavi Khorasan Province, Iran. At the 2006 census, its population was 260, in 69 families.

References 

Populated places in Khoshab County